Afrane Frank (born 21 February 1997) known by the stage name Okese1 is a Ghanaian rapper and hip hop musician.

Early life
Okese1 hails from Bonwire, a suburb of Ejisu-Juaben Municipal District, a town in the Ashanti Region of Ghana. He had his senior high school education at Anglican Senior High School, Kumasi. He then proceeded to the University of Cape Coast for his tertiary education.

Music career
Okese1 debuted in the music scene in Ghana in 2020 with his debut single and video YIE YIE.

Controversy
He got into a banter with radio presenter Andy Dosty after being late for an interview which got him sacked from the studio's of Hitz FM in Accra. He also got into a social media banter with fellow rapper Medikal and called him a sellout.

Discography
Okese1 - Hustle ft. Medikal - 2020
Okese1 - Young Rich Nigga ft. AMG Armani
Okese1 - Amount - 2020
Okese1 - YIE YIE - 2020
Okese1 - WOSO - 2020
Okese1 - Silence Freestyle - 2020
Okese1 - Na Today - 2020
Okese1 - MOMO - 2021

Awards and nominations

References

Living people
Ghanaian rappers
1997 births
Ghanaian musicians